South Nietta is a rural locality in the local government areas (LGA) of Central Coast and Kentish in the North-west and west LGA region of Tasmania. The 2016 census recorded a population of 9 for the state suburb of South Nietta.

History 
South Nietta was gazetted as a locality in 1965.

Geography
The Lea River and the Wilmot River together form most of the eastern boundary.

Road infrastructure 
Route C129 (South Nietta Road) enters the locality from the north.

References

Towns in Tasmania
Localities of Central Coast Council (Tasmania)
Localities of Kentish Council